= Balochki =

Balochki is a term that may refer to:

- Balochi language, an Iranian language of Pakistan, Iran and Afghanistan
- Saraiki language, an Indo-Aryan language of Pakistan
